Sabby may refer to:
Sabby Lewis, American musician
Sabby Piscitelli, American NFL player and professional wrestler